Highway 307 is a highway in the Canadian province of Saskatchewan. It runs from Highway 7 to Highway 21.

Highway 307 also intersects Highways 772 and 675. It passes near the communities of Smiley and Coleville.

References

307